Rostov Oblast is a federal subject of Russia (an oblast), located in the Southern Federal District. Its administrative center is the city of Rostov-on-Don, which also became the administrative center of the Southern Federal District in 2002.

Geography

Rostov Oblast borders Ukraine (Donetsk and Luhansk Oblasts) and also Volgograd and Voronezh Oblasts in the north, Krasnodar and Stavropol Krais in the south, and the Republic of Kalmykia in the east. The Rostov oblast is located in the Pontic-Caspian steppe. It is directly north over the North Caucasus and west of the Yergeni hills.

It is within the Russian Southern Federal District.

Rivers and lakes
The Don River, one of Europe's longest rivers, flows through the oblast for part of its course. Lakes cover only 0.4% of the oblast's area.

Administrative divisions

It was formed in 1937 out of the Azov-Black Sea Krai.

Demographics
Population: 

Vital statistics for 2012
Births: 49 715 (11.7 per 1000)
Deaths: 59 376 (14.0 per 1000) 

Total fertility rate
2012: 1.51 | 2013: 1.52 | 2014: 1.61 | 2015: 1.63 | 2016: 1.60 (estimate)

Ethnic groups 
Residents identified themselves as belonging to 157 different ethnic groups, including 27 of more than 2,000 persons each. The largest ethnicities are the 3,795,607 Russians (90.3%); the 110,727 Armenians (2.6%) and the 77,802 Ukrainians (1.9%). Other important groups are the 35,902 Turks (0.9%); 16,493 Belarusians (0.4%); 13,948 Tatars (0.3%); 17,961 Azerbaijanis (0.4%); 11,449 Chechens (0.3%); 16,657 Romani (0.4%); 11,597 Koreans (0.3%); 8,296 Georgians (0.2%), and 2,040 Assyrians (.05%). There were also 76,498 people (1.8%) belonging to other ethno-cultural groupings. 76,735 people were registered from administrative databases, and could not declare an ethnicity. It is estimated that the proportion of ethnicities in this group is the same as that of the declared group.

Religion

According to a 2012 survey 49.5% of the population of Rostov Oblast adheres to the Russian Orthodox Church, 6% are unaffiliated generic Christians, 1% are either Orthodox Christian believers who do not belong to church or are members of other (non-Russian) Orthodox bodies, 1% are Muslims, and 1% are adherents of the Slavic native faith (Rodnovery) movement. In addition, 26% of the population declares to be "spiritual but not religious", 12% is atheist, and 3.5% follows other religions or did not give an answer to the question.

The Ascension Cathedral is the largest Russian Orthodox church in Novocherkassk, Rostov Oblast, Russia. It used to be one of the largest churches of the Russian Empire and the main church of the Don Host Province.

The five-domed building, which stands 75 meters tall, is a notable example of Russian Neo-Byzantine architecture. It was erected between 1891 and 1904 on the site of an earlier church. The first church on the site was built to Luigi Rusca's designs. It collapsed in 1846. A replacement church collapsed 17 years later.

Church of the Intercession of the Holy Virgin ― one of the oldest churches in Rostov-on-Don. For a considerable period of time, Intercession Church served as the principal church not only for the fortress of St. Dimitry of Rostov but also for the people of local settlements. Since the end of the 18th century, the Church of Intercession had been considered to be a cathedral. The status changed in 1822, when Church of the Nativity of the Blessed Virgin Mary on the decree of the Holy Synod was declared cathedral.

Culture

Attractions

Theatres

 Rostov academic drama theatre, named after Maxim Gorky.
  Rostov State Musical Theater. The theater opened in September 1999, and is the successor to the 1919 Rostov Musical Comedy Theater, one of the best operetta theaters in the Soviet Union.

The theater has two stages as well as a music and entertainment center, and hosts about 300 performances and concerts annually, as well as various forums and festivals. Its repertoire encompasses both musical traditions, as well as experiments in the field of contemporary art.

 Rostov state puppet theatre.
 Rostov regional academic youth theatre (former Rostov theatre for young spectators).
 Taganrog Theatre. The Taganrog Theater was established in 1827 by governor Alexander Dunaev. The theater was subsidized by the Taganrog's City Council since 1828, and its first director was Alexander Gor. The first group of Russian drama artists was directed by Perovsky and toured around the region, giving performances in Rostov on Don, Novocherkassk, Bahmut. The repertoire consisted mainly of dramas, melodramas and vaudevilles.  In 1874, the Taganrog Municipality acquired the theater building by the purchase of its stocks.
 Don theatre of drama and Comedy V. F. Komissarzhevskaya (the Cossack drama theatre) Novocherkassk.
 Shakhty drama theatre, Shakhty.
 Novoshakhtinskiy drama theatre, Novoshakhtinsk.

Museums

In Rostov-on-Don

 Center for Contemporary Art "Tobacco Factory".
 Rostov Regional Museum of Local History.
 Rostov Regional Museum of Fine Arts.
 Museum of Contemporary Art at Dmitrovskaya.
 Museum of Russian-Armenian Friendship.
 Museum of North Caucasus Railway.  The first museum of history of North Caucasus Railway opened on 4 November 1960 in a Community Center of railwaymen at Rostov-Glavny station. Permanent exposition includes: information boards about famous North Caucasus railwaymen, model trains on a scale 1:15, uniform, cases, panoramas, implements of various times. The exhibition covers the period from emergence of rail transport in the region up to the present moment. The various collections from the Russian Civil War and the Great Patriotic War, now exceed 12,000 objects in the main fund.

In other cities of the region

 Aksai Military History Museum, Aksay.
 Archaeological museum-reserve "Tanais", Nedvigovka.
 Azov Museum of History, Archaeology and Palaeontology, Azov. The bulk of the museum is located in the three-story building erected in 1892 which belonged to the former town council, there are 22 rooms.  The symbol of the museum is the skeleton of a Trogontherium mammoth that existed 800-600 thousand years ago in the interglacial period. This is the world's unique skeleton with the whole skull. The museum's areas: permanent exhibitions - 2852 m2, temporary exhibitions - 580 m2, storage facilities - 1896 m2, park (open air) - 7.13 hectares. 
 Bataysk Museum of History, Bataysk.
 Gukovo Museum of Mining Work, Gukovo.
 House-Museum of S. Budyonny, Stan. Budennovskaya.
 Novocherkassk Museum of the History of the Don Cossacks, Novocherkassk.
 Razdorsk Ethnographic Museum-Reserve, the camp. Razdorskaya.
 Salsk Art Museum named after People's Artist VK Nechitailo, Salsk.
 Shakhty Museum of Local History, Shakhty.
 Taganrog military museum, Taganrog. The start of museum exhibition creation refers to May 9, 2004, when the club Auto-Retro Taganrog was founded. Subsequently, several vehicle units were purchased and repaired. In 2008, club activity concept got military direction. On May 6, 2010, permanent exhibition consisting of several thousands of exhibits was opened. In July 2012, the name Taganrog military museum got official status.
 The State Museum-Reserve of MA Sholokhov, St. Veshenskaya.
 Volgodonsk Art Museum, Volgodonsk.
 Volgodonsk Ecological and Historical Museum, Volgodonsk.

Economy
Major industries of Rostov Oblast are agriculture, agricultural industry, food processing, heavy industry, coal and automobile manufacture.

The largest companies in the region include Novoshakhtinsk Petrochemical Plant, Gloria Jeans Corp., Rostvertol, Oil-extracting factory "Yug Rusi", North Caucasian Railway.

Banking sector
In the Rostov Region in 1989, the first commercial bank in Southern Russia, Rostovsoсbank, was created on the basis of the regional division of the Zhilsotsbank USSR. The bank existed from 1989 to 1998, with four branches operating in Rostov-on-Don. In addition, the bank had branches in the cities of Taganrog, Shakhty, Gukovo and Donetsk. In 1998 Rostovsotsbank lost solvency, but was able to ensure full repayment of deposits to all depositors before the establishment of the Deposit Insurance System, even before the revocation of the banking license.

From 1999 to 2010, one of the largest banks in Southern Russia was Donskoy Narodny Bank (Don People's Bank), located in Rostov-on-Don.

As of 2022, there are 7 regional credit organizations and 21 bank branches operating in Rostov Oblast. The leading positions are taken by Sberbank, VTB, Alfa-Bank, Rosbank, Center-Invest and Fora-Bank.

Gallery

References

Sources

External links

Official website of Rostov Oblast 
Russian South. News and events of Rostov Oblast
Official Tourism Portal of Rostov Oblast 
Official Tourism Portal of Rostov Oblast 
Central Eurasian Information Resource: Images of Rostov Oblast - University of Washington Digital Collection

 
1937 establishments in Russia
History of the Don Cossacks
States and territories established in 1937
Southern Federal District